Kongu Tamil or Kovai Tamil is the dialect of Tamil language that is spoken by the people in Kongu Nadu, which is the western region of Tamil Nadu. It is originally known as "Kangee"` or "Kongalam" or "Kongappechu or Kongu bashai or Coimbatore Tamil".

Variations
The speciality of Kongu Tamil is the use of the alveolar ற - Tra/Dra (as in the English word track) instead of retroflex T/D (ட) of standard Tamil. For example, 'ennuDaya' (mine) of standard Tamil is pronounced enRa in the Kongu dialect. However, only Coimbatore district people use this. Additionally the use of guttural nasal (ங்) that sounds "ng" as in the English word Gang, is more prevalent in Kongu Tamil, leading to situations where the grammar of Kongu Tamil would not fit into the grammar of standard Tamil. One of the examples is the use of ங் to end a word like வாங் "vaang" or வாஙொ "vango" means 'come' expressed in a respectful tone, which in standard Tamil would be வாங்க "vaanga". Both of these are stereotyping Kongalam with regional, professional variations.

Kongu Tamil also uses certain Tamil words that are archaic to Kongu region and are not used in modern Tamil.

See also 

 Kongu Nadu, region in South India
 Kongu Vellalar, community in South India
 Coimbatore, metropolis in Tamil Nadu, India

References 

Tamil dialects
Dravidian languages